is a 1959 Japanese film directed by Tadashi Imai which addresses the subject of children from interracial relationships.

Cast
Emiko Takahashi
George Okunoyama
Tanie Kitabayashi
Kōji Mitsui
Osamu Takizawa
Rentarō Mikuni
Seiji Miyaguchi
Eijirō Tōno
Masao Oda
Masao Mishima

Awards and nominations
10th Blue Ribbon Awards
 Won: Best Film
 Won: Best Actress - Tanie Kitabayashi
 Won: Best Screenplay - Youko Mizuki

References

1959 films
Films directed by Imai Tadashi
Japanese black-and-white films
Best Film Kinema Junpo Award winners
1950s Japanese films